The Mato Grosso-class destroyer is a class of destroyers of the Brazilian Navy.

Development 

After World War II, they were in a mothball state, but were later handed over to Brazil based on the Brazil-US Ship Loan Agreement. Only the lead ship had not undergone FRAM, thus the ships having different armaments and configurations.

Ships in the class

References

Bibliography 
 

Destroyer classes
 
Destroyers of the Cold War